Lyncina vitellus, common name : the calf cowry or the Pacific deer cowry, is a species of sea snail, a cowry, a marine gastropod mollusk in the family Cypraeidae, the cowries.

Subspecies and formae
 Lyncina vitellus dama (Perry, 1811) 
 Lyncina vitellus polynesiae Schilder & Schilder 1939 
 Lyncina vitellus vitellus orcina Iredale, 1931

Description

The shape is usually pear-shaped, the dorsum surface is smooth and shiny and may be pale or dark brown, with several small white spots. The margins and the extremities are clearer, while the base is generally white, with a wide sinuous aperture and long labial teeth. The margins show also numerous thin vertical whitish lines. The juvenile forms have two-three clearer trasversal bands on the shell dorsum. These shells are quite similar and may be confused with the shells of Lyncina camelopardalis. In the living cowries the mantle is grey-brown and almost transparent, with long whitish tree-shaped papillae. Mantle and foot are very well developed, usually with external antennae.

Distribution
This species is distributed in the Red Sea and in the Indian Ocean along Aldabra, Chagos, the Comores, Kenya, Madagascar, the Mascarene Basin,  Mauritius, Mozambique, Réunion, the Seychelles, Somalia and Tanzania and also along Jeju island, Philippines, Palau Islands, Samoa Islands, Polynesia, Hawaii and Vietnam.

Habitat
They live in tropical  intertidal and subtidal water at about of depth on coral reef, usually under coral slabs and stones.

References

External links
 Biolib
 Sealife

Cypraeidae
Gastropods described in 1758
Taxa named by Carl Linnaeus